PDAF may refer to:
 Probabilistic data association filter, a statistical approach to the problem of plot association in a radar tracker
 Priority Development Assistance Fund, a discretionary fund in the Philippines
 Phase-detection autofocus, a type of autofocus used In some cameras